Kurdistan or Kordestan province is one of the 31 provinces of Iran. The province is 28,817 km2 in area and its capital is the city of Sanandaj.  Other counties with their major cities are Saqqez, Baneh, Marivan, Qorveh, Piranshahr, Bijar, Kamyaran, Dehgolan, Diwandarreh and Sarvabad.

Kurdistan province is located in the west of Iran, in Region 3. It borders the Kurdistan Region of Iraq to the west, and the Iranian provinces of West Azerbaijan to the north, Zanjan to the northeast, Hamadan to the east, and Kermanshah to the south. It exists within both Iranian Kurdistan and Kurdistan.

At the National Census conducted in 2006, the province had a population of 1,416,334 inhabitants in 337,179 households. The following census in 2011 counted 1,493,645 living in 401,845 households. At the time of the most recent census in 2016, the population of the province had risen to 1,603,011 in 471,310 households.

History

The earliest human occupation of Kurdistan dates back to the Paleolithic Period when Neanderthals lived in the Sirwan Valley of Kurdistan more than 40,000 years ago.

Administrative divisions
Kurdistan province is sub-divided into 10 counties (shahrestan), with populations as follows at the 2006, 2011, and 2016 censuses. Each county is named after the city that serves as its administrative capital.

Cities
According to the 2016 census, 1,134,229 people (over 70% of the population of Kurdistan province) live in the following cities: Armardeh 2,305, Babarashani 509, Baneh 110,218, Bardeh Rasheh 1,020, Bijar 50,014, Bolbanabad 3,193, Buin-e Sofla 1,518, Chenareh 455, Dehgolan 25,992, Delbaran 6,713, Dezej 2,219, Divandarreh 34,007, Ghorveh 78,276, Kamyaran 57,077, Kani Dinar 13,059, Kani Sur 1,284, Marivan 136,654, Muchesh 3,370, Pir Taj 1,199, Saheb 3,101, Sanandaj 412,767, Saqqez 165,258, Sarvabad 5,121, Serishabad 7,196, Shuyesheh 1,302, Tup Aghaj 1,645, Uraman Takht 3,176, Yasukand 3,490, and Zarrineh 2,091.

Most populous cities
The following sorted table lists the most populous cities in Kurdistan in 2016.

Demographics
Kurds are the majority of the population, but Turkics populate the eastern provincial borderlands. Most of the Kurdish population speak Sorani Kurdish, but Southern Kurdish is spoken in the eastern parts of the province, including in Bijar and Dezej, while Gorani is the main language in many villages in the southwestern part of the province. Oghuz Turkic varieties can be found in the far-eastern part of the province, including in the cities of Delbaran, Pir Taj, Serishabad, Yasukand, and Tup Aghaj. These varieties are described as distinct from Iranian Azerbaijani, although they are closely related to it. While not being the primary language in any settlement in the province, Persian is increasingly becoming the first language, especially among the population in the eastern parts of the province.

Economy

The major activities of the inhabitants are agriculture and modern livestock farming. Wheat, barley, grains and fruits are the major agricultural products. The chemical, metal, textile, leather and food industries are the main industrial activities in this province. This province has one of the largest rates of unemployment in Iran. According to Iranian statistics, more than twenty thousand people depend on being a kolbar for sustenance.

Colleges and universities
Kurdistan University of Medical Sciences
Tohid Medical Center
 University of Kurdistan
Islamic Azad University of Sanandaj

See also
Hajar Khatoon Mosque
Uramanat Villages
Iranian Kurdistan
Kurdistan
Kurdistan (disambiguation)

References

External links

Kordestan Province Cultural Heritage Organization
Pālangān under snow - some photographs

 
Provinces of Iran
Iranian Kurdistan